Alan Irwin Broadley (13 September 1920 – 23 October 1997) was an Australian rules footballer who played for the South Melbourne Football Club in the Victorian Football League (VFL).

Personal life
Broadley served as a corporal in the Australian Army during the Second World War.

Notes

External links 

1920 births
1997 deaths
Australian Army personnel of World War II
Australian Army soldiers
Australian rules footballers from Victoria (Australia)
Sportspeople from Workington
Sydney Swans players
VFL/AFL players born outside Australia